This is a list of NCAA Division III college football seasons. Prior to 1973, Division III schools participated in the NCAA's College Division.

Seasons

See also
List of NCAA Division I-A/FBS football seasons
List of NCAA Division I-AA/FCS football seasons
List of NCAA Division II football seasons

References